Punashcha Professor Shonku (Shonku Once Again) is a Professor Shonku series book written by Satyajit Ray  and published by Ananda Publishers in 1993. Ray wrote these stories about Professor Shanku for Bengali magazines Sandesh and Anandamela. This book is a collection of five Shanku stories.

Stories
 Ashcharjantu,
 Shonku o Adim Manush,
 Shonkur Porolokchorcha,
 Professor Rondir Time Machine

See also
Shabash Professor Shonku
Professor Shonkur Kandokarkhana

References

1993 books
Science fiction short story collections
Professor Shonku